McGugan is a surname. Notable people with the surname include:

Irene McGugan (born 1952), Scottish politician
Jackie McGugan (born 1939), Scottish footballer
Lewis McGugan (born 1988), English footballer
Malcolm McGugan (1846–1937), Canadian politician
Paul McGugan (born 1964), Scottish footballer
Stuart McGugan (born 1944), Scottish actor